Actumnus is a genus of crabs in the family Pilumnidae. Alongside the 28 extant species, it has a fossil record extending back into the Miocene.

Species
Actumnus contains 28 extant species:

Actumnus amirantensis Rathbun, 1911
Actumnus anthelmei Ward, 1942
Actumnus arbutum Alcock, 1898
Actumnus asper (Rüppell, 1830)
Actumnus calypso (Herbst, 1801)
Actumnus davoensis Ward, 1941
Actumnus digitalis (Rathbun, 1907)
Actumnus dorsipes (Stimpson, 1858)
Actumnus elegans De Man, 1888
Actumnus fissifrons Alcock, 1898
Actumnus forficigerus (Stimpson, 1858)
Actumnus globulus Heller, 1891
Actumnus granotuberosus Garth & Kim, 1983
Actumnus griffini Takeda & Webber, 2006
Actumnus intermedius Balss, 1922
Actumnus margarodes MacGilchrist, 1905
Actumnus marissinicus Takeda & Miyake, 1977
Actumnus miliaris A. Milne-Edwards, 1865
Actumnus obesus Dana, 1852
Actumnus parvulus A. Milne-Edwards, 1865
Actumnus setifer (De Haan, 1835)
Actumnus setosiareolatus Takeda, 1977
Actumnus similis Takeda & Miyake, 1969
Actumnus simplex Rathbun, 1911
Actumnus squamosus (De Haan, 1835)
Actumnus taiwanicus Ho, Yu & Ng, 2001
Actumnus targionii Cano, 1889
Actumnus tesselatus Alcock, 1898

Two further species are known only from fossils.

References

Pilumnoidea
Extant Miocene first appearances